Saint-Disdier (Vivaro-Alpine: Sant Disdier) is a former commune in the Hautes-Alpes department in southeastern France. On 1 January 2013, Agnières-en-Dévoluy, La Cluse, Saint-Disdier, and Saint-Étienne-en-Dévoluy amalgamated into the new commune of Dévoluy.

Population

See also
Communes of the Hautes-Alpes department

References

Former communes of Hautes-Alpes